Lakhan is a 1979 Hindi film directed by Dinesh-Ramanesh.

Cast 
 Amjad Khan as Lakhan
 Ranjeet as Munna
 Amrish Puri as Diwan Hariprasad
 Navin Nischol as Vijay
 Ranjeeta Kaur as Lata
 Padma Khanna as Gulabjaan
 Chand Usmani as Maharani

Soundtrack

External links
 

1979 films
1970s Hindi-language films